Bladelets can refer to:
Bladelet (impeller)
Bladelet (archaeology)